The first season of the international fantasy series Highlander: The Series, part of the Highlander franchise, consisted of 22 episodes produced between 1992 and 1993, and began airing on October 3, 1992 in broadcast syndication. Highlander: The Series follows the adventures of Duncan MacLeod, a 400-year-old Immortal who can only die if he is beheaded; conflict inevitably finds him because he is part of the Gathering, an ongoing battle in which all Immortals have to fight and behead each other until only one is left. The season was released on DVD as a nine-disc boxed set on November 12, 2002 by Anchor Bay Entertainment. It is also available at the online video on demand service Hulu, a joint venture between NBC and Fox Broadcasting Company.

Production
The French leading production company Gaumont Television bought the rights to the series to have it produced in syndication in America with a local crew, a ground-breaking move at the time. Highlander marked the first time a French production company was creatively involved in a show intended for the American market. The show was co-produced in syndication by international partners including Gaumont, RTL Plus (Germany), Rysher Distribution (United States), Reteitalia Productions (Italy), Amuse Video (Japan) and TF1 (France). The budget of the first season was US$26.1 million. Keith Samples, president of Rysher, stated that "about 75% of the guaranteed budget came from overseas sales." The remaining 25% came from United States sales and the producers retained the distribution rights, which allowed the show to produce $800,000 per episode only from international income, believed to be the top result of the 1992-1993 season. To secure an adequate share of European content, and as a result of the co-production agreement, each season was divided into two segments, the first segment was filmed in Vancouver, British Columbia, Canada (posing at the fictional location of Seacouver, Washington, United States), the second in Paris, France. The production of the first segment began in Vancouver on 13 July 1992, while the production of the second segment started in December 1992 in Paris and used the studios of French state production agency Société Française de Production (SFP) at Bry-sur-Marne near Paris.

The executive producers were Bill Panzer, Peter S. Davis, Gaumont Television president Christian Charret and Gaumont co-production chief Marla Ginsburg. Steven Maier, Sheryl Hardy and Guy Collins were co-executive producers. Kevin Droney and Philip John Taylor were supervising producers at the beginning of the season; from the seventh episode onwards, David Abramowitz became supervising producer instead of Taylor. The producers were Barry Rosen and Gary Goodman. Executives in charge of production were Marc du Pontavice and Denis Leroy. Scripts were contributed by both staff and freelance writers, Brian Clemens among the latter. Brent-Carl Clackson was line producer on the Vancouver segment, from episode one to thirteen. When production moved to Paris, Clackson was succeeded by Patrick Millet (with the title of production manager) for episodes fourteen to twenty-two. The regular directors were Thomas J. Wright, Jorge Montesi and Ray Austin. The fencing coach was Bob Anderson, who coined for himself the title of Master of Swords. Anderson choreographed the fights on the Vancouver segment then was succeeded by Peter Diamond, credited as second unit director and stunt coordinator on the Paris segment. The opening theme was "Princes of the Universe" from the 1986 album A Kind of Magic by Queen; incidental music was composed by Roger Bellon.

Cast
Three roles had star billing: Adrian Paul played Duncan MacLeod, Alexandra Vandernoot acted as MacLeod's French lover Tessa Noël, a mortal artist and sculptor, and Stan Kirsch portrayed young, quick-talking petty thief Richie Ryan. Amanda Wyss, who played ambitious and inquisitive journalist Randi McFarland, was only credited in the six episodes she appeared in. The first episode, "The Gathering", features a guest appearance of Christopher Lambert, reprising his role as Connor MacLeod from the Highlander movies. Several recurring characters were also introduced this season, including Werner Stocker as Immortal monk Darius, Roland Gift as hedonistic killer Xavier St. Cloud, Elizabeth Gracen as international thief Amanda, Roger Daltrey as Immortal Hugh Fitzcairn and Peter Hudson as James Horton, the leader of the Hunters, a group of mortals who believe that Immortals must be eliminated.

Reception

The pilot episode "The Gathering" achieved a 3.4/7 rating, meaning that 3.4 percent of viewers aged 18 to 49 as well as 7 percent of all viewers watching television at the time saw the episode. The Hollywood Reporter qualified this as a "solid performance" and Samples commented that it "more than met the company's expectations." Samples also estimated that "the first season averaged a healthy 4 rating in domestic syndication and was strong in both men and women demos 18–49," while Charret felt the first season did "quite well." Rick Sanchez of IGN wrote that season one was "all about finding the show's footing" and "was pretty squarely mired in the movies that had come before and in the formula for making a weekly action series." It has been released on DVD in Region 1 on November 12, 2002 by Anchor Bay Entertainment, and in Region 2 on December 7, 2004.

Episodes

Home media

Notes

References

External links
Highlander: The Series episode list at Epguides
Highlander: The Series episode list at the Internet Movie Database

1
1992 Canadian television seasons
1993 Canadian television seasons
1992 French television seasons
1993 French television seasons